Passiflora sprucei is a species of plant in the family Passifloraceae. It is found in western Ecuador and Northern Peru.

References

sprucei
Least concern plants
Taxonomy articles created by Polbot